, provisional designation , is a trans-Neptunian object from the classical Kuiper belt, located in the outermost region of the Solar System. The cubewano belongs to the cold population. It has a perihelion (closest approach to the Sun) at 40.297 AU and an aphelion (farthest approach from the Sun) of 48.306 AU. It is about 146 km in diameter. It was discovered on 28 April 1998, at the Mauna Kea Observatory, Hawaii.

References

External links 
 
 

Cold classical Kuiper belt objects
Discoveries by the Mauna Kea Observatories
19980428